Hua Hin is one of eight districts (amphoe) of Prachuap Khiri Khan province in the northern part of the Malay Peninsula in Thailand. Its seat of government, also named Hua Hin, is a beach resort town.

Hua Hin district is in the middle of what the Thai government is promoting as the "Thai Riviera", the stretch of coastline between Phetchaburi in the north and Chumphon in the south.

History

In 1834, before the name Hua Hin was coined, some agricultural areas of Phetchaburi province were hit by severe drought. A group of farmers moved south until they found a small village that had bright white sand and a row of rocks along the beach. They settled there and gave it the name Samore Riang (Samo Riang), which means 'rows of rocks'.

In 1921 the director of the state railway, Prince Purachatra, built the Railway Hotel close to the beach. Prince Krom Phra Naresworarit was the first member of the royal family to build a group of palaces at Ban Laem Hin, called Sukaves, and gave the beach next to his palace the name "Hua Hin". King Prajadhipok (Rama VII) liked the place so much that he built a summer palace there which was later named Klai Kang Won ('far from worries'). From 2004 until 2006 it was the full-time residence of King Bhumibol Adulyadej (Rama IX), until health issues forced him to return to Siriraj Hospital in Bangkok, where medical facilities and physicians were closer at hand.

In 1932 Hua Hin was part of Pran Buri district as a minor district (king amphoe). In 1949 Hua Hin became a separate district of Prachuap Khiri Khan.  After the building of Thailand's southern railway connected the district with Bangkok along with various destinations en route, Hua Hin became the first and most popular beach resort in the country. Over the five year period from 2014–2019, the number of Thai and foreign visitors to Hua Hin has risen six percent per year.

In August 2016, there were four bomb blasts in Hua Hin over a period of 24 hours. One person died, 20 others were injured. In the aftermath of the bombing 90 security cameras were installed and are monitored by the Tourist Police. Another 60 cameras are monitored by the municipal office. There are plans to install several hundred more.

Climate

Hua Hin has a tropical savanna climate (Köppen climate classification Aw). Historically, temperatures are very warm to hot throughout the year, with only small variations. The year begins with the dry season (December–April), before the monsoon arrives in May. Rains ease somewhat from June to August before the heaviest rains begin in September and continue through November.

Administration

Central administration 
Hua Hin district is divided into seven sub-districts (tambons), which are further subdivided into 63 administrative villages (mubans).

Local administration 
There is one town (thesaban mueang) in the district:
 Hua Hin consisting of sub-districts Hua Hin and Nong Kae.

There is one sub-district municipality (thesaban tambon) in the district:
 Nong Phlap consisting of parts of sub-district Nong Phlap.

There are five sub-district administrative organizations (SAO) in the district:
 Hin Lek Fai consisting of sub-district Hin Lek Fai.
 Nong Phlap consisting of parts of sub-district Nong Phlap.
 Thap Tai consisting of sub-district Thap Tai.
 Huai Sat Yai consisting of sub-district Huai Sat Yai.
 Bueng Nakhon consisting of sub-district Bueng Nakhon.

Environment

The quality of the waters of the Gulf of Thailand off central Hua Hin were rated " good to fair" in 2016 by the Pollution Control Department.

Boundaries
Hua Hin district is bordered by:

North: Cha-am district, Phetchaburi province.
East: Gulf of Thailand
West: Myanmar (Burma)
South: Pran Buri district, Prachuap Khiri Khan province.

Transport 
Hua Hin is served by road, rail, and sea routes.

The main station is Hua Hin railway station and it is the northernmost station in the district. Smaller stations are also located in the area including Nong Kae railway station which is closer to Khao Takiap, Suan Son Pradiphat Railway Halt, close to Suan Son Pradiphat Beach and Rajabhakti Park as well as Khao Tao railway station.

, work is underway on the construction of double tracks from Bangkok's Bang Sue Central Station to Chumphon. Trains will travel the route at up to 160 kilometres per hour. The new tracks—due to be completed in 2022—will enable trains to travel the Bangkok–Hua Hin segment in "two to three hours" according to a State Railway of Thailand (SRT) spokesman. As a comparison, SRT's Train 44 travels from Hua Hin to Bangkok's Bangkok Railway Station in three hours and thirty-three minutes (02:22–05:55). Plans for high-speed rail from Bangkok to Surat Thani which would serve Hua Hin en route, have been shelved due to lack of investor interest.

Since 2018, there is no longer daily ferry service between Hua Hin and Pattaya.. In November 2018, Hua Hin deputy chief Chareewat Phramanee confirmed the ferry service, suspended due to low tourist numbers during low season, would be up and running again for high season between Hua Hin and Pattaya, a 2.5 hour journey on a catamaran with a maximum capacity of 340.

Hua Hin Airport is in Hua Hin District. AirAsia serves the airport with a direct flight only to Chiang Mai. The other destinations have been deleted 

In August 2018 the Department of Airports announced that it will spend 3.5 billion baht to upgrade Hua Hin Airport over the next five years. The number of travellers using the airport is expected to increase by tenfold, to three million a year, in that time frame. The upgrade is part of the "Riviera Thailand" and Southern Economic Corridor projects. The work at the airport will take four to five years. It includes enlarging the existing passenger terminal, building a second one, expanding hangar space, and widening the runway from 30 to 45 metres.

Education
Hua Hin and Cha-am host a number of tertiary education institutions such as Kasetsart University Veterinary Teaching Hospital, Silpakorn University, Suan Dusit Rajabhat (Hospitality) University, and the Petchaburi Technology and Agricultural University. Webster University Thailand had a campus near Hua Hin, but ceased operations on December 31, 2021. The Rajamangala University of Technology also has a campus in the vicinity, the Rattanakosin (Wangklaikangwon Campus).

See also
 Ko Sai (Islands off Hua Hin)
 Cha-am district

References

External links

 
Hua Hin
Hua Hin
Cities and towns in Thailand